Bandonhill (sometimes spelt as Bandon Hill) is a small locality in the London Borough of Sutton, located between Wallington and Beddington.

It is best known for Bandon Hill Cemetery, which opened in 1899. Bandon Halt railway station formerly served the area, however this closed in 1914.

References

Areas of London
Districts of the London Borough of Sutton